The 2012 Chinese FA Super Cup (Chinese: 2012中国足球协会超级杯) was the 10th Chinese Football Super Cup, an annual football match contested by the winners of the previous season's Super League and FA Cup competitions. The match was played at the Guangzhou University City Stadium on 25 February 2012, and contested by league winner Guangzhou Evergrande and cup winner Tianjin Teda. Guangzhou Evergrande won the title 2–1.

Match details 

Assistant referees:
 Su Jige (Beijing)
 Huo Weiming (Beijing)

Fourth official:
Zhou Gang (Wuhan)

See also 
2011 Chinese Super League
2011 Chinese FA Cup

References

External links
 

FA Super Cup
2012
Guangzhou F.C. matches